Sant Miquel de Tudela is a church located near Cervera (Catalonia). It is listed on the Inventory of the Architectural Heritage of Catalonia.

Churches in Catalonia